Georgia Anne Muldrow (born 1983) is an American musician from Los Angeles, California. In 2008, she co-founded the SomeOthaShip Connect record label with fellow artist and former husband Dudley Perkins.

Life and career
Georgia Anne Muldrow grew up in a musical environment of her session musician parents, the jazz guitarist Ronald Muldrow and a singer, now Rickie Byars-Beckwith.

In 2006, Muldrow released the debut EP, Worthnothings, on Stones Throw Records. Her first album, Olesi: Fragments of an Earth, was released on the label in that year.

In 2012, she released Seeds, an album entirely produced by Madlib, on SomeOthaShip Connect.

In 2018, she released Overload on Brainfeeder.

Style and influences
In The New York Times article in 2009, rapper Mos Def compared Muldrow's music to Roberta Flack, Nina Simone, and Ella Fitzgerald. AllMusic described her as "one of the most daring and important (albeit underappreciated) artists of her time".

Discography

Studio albums
 Olesi: Fragments of an Earth (2006)
 Sagala (2007) 
 The Message Uni Versa (2007) 
 Umsindo (2009)
 Early (2009)
 SomeOthaShip (2010) 
 Ocotea (2010) 
 Kings Ballad (2010)
 Vweto (2011)
 Owed to Mama Rickie (2011)
 The Blackhouse (2012) 
 Seeds (2012)
 Denderah (2013) 
 The Lighthouse (2013) 
 Oligarchy Sucks! (2014)
 A Thoughtiverse Unmarred (2015)
 Overload (2018)
 Vweto II (2019)
 Black Love & War (2019) 
 Mama, You Can Bet! (2020) 
VWETO III (2021)

Mixtapes
 Beautiful Mindz (2008)

EPs
 Worthnothings (2006)
 Heaven or Hell (2010) 
 Ms. One (2014)

Singles
 "A Requiem for Leroy" (2006)
 "Seeds" (2012)
 "Tell Em (Remix)" (2012) 
 "Popstopper" (2013) 
 "Akosua" (2013)

Guest appearances
 Platinum Pied Pipers - "Your Day Is Done", "Lights Out", and "One Minute More" from Triple P (2005)
 Eric Lau - "Yet & Still" from Eric Lau Presents Dudley and Friends (2006)
 Oh No - "T. Biggums" from Exodus into Unheard Rhythms (2006)
 Sa-Ra Creative Partners - "Fly Away" from The Hollywood Recordings (2007)
 Erykah Badu - "Master Teacher" from  New Amerykah Part One (2008)
 Mos Def - "Roses" from The Ecstatic (2009)
 Electric Wire Hustle - "This World" from Electric Wire Hustle (2009)
 Erykah Badu - "Out My Mind, Just In Time" from New Amerykah Part Two (2010)
 Oh No - "Improvement" from Disrupted Ads (2013)
 The Black Opera - "Beginning of the End" from The Great Year (2014)
 Akua Naru - "Mr. Brownskin" from The Miner's Canary (2015)
 Declaime - "The Message 2014", "Concentration", and "Flys Eye" from Southside Story (2015)
 J-Zen - "God Music" from Managua (2015)
 Miles Davis and Robert Glasper - "Milestones" from Everything's Beautiful (2016)
 Nosizwe - "The Best Drug" from In Fragments (2016)
 Them That Do - "Trying to Say" from Them That Do (2016)
 Eun - "Fox" from Darkness Must Be Beautiful (2018)
 Blood Orange - "Runnin'" from Negro Swan (2018)
 Clever Austin - "You Are All You Need" from Pareidolia (2019)
 Kidd Mojo - "Pearls" from Dionysia (2020)
 Sons Of The James - "Things I Should Have Said" from Everlasting (2020)
 Seba Kaapstad - "Free"  from Konke (2020)
Denzel Curry and Kenny Beats - "Track07 (Georgia Anne Muldrow Version)"  from Unlocked 1.5 (2021)
 Brittany Howard - "History Repeats" (Geemix) from Jaime (Reimagined) (2021)

References

External links
 

1983 births
Living people
American women rappers
American hip hop singers
Singers from Los Angeles
Stones Throw Records artists
American women in electronic music
21st-century American women singers
American funk singers
21st-century American rappers
Brainfeeder artists
Rappers from Los Angeles
21st-century American singers
21st-century women rappers